Crossing is a two-act opera composed by Matthew Aucoin. Based on Walt Whitman's Memoranda During the War (1875), it  offers a fictionalized account of Whitman's time as a nurse during the American Civil War.

Performance history

Crossing premiered at the American Repertory Theater on May 29, 2015. Aucoin conducted the Boston-based chamber orchestra A Far Cry, Diane Paulus directed. Crossing had its New York premiere on October 3, 2017, at the Brooklyn Academy of Music Next Wave Festival. It was subsequently performed in concert form by the Los Angeles Opera on May 25, 2018, as a part of their Off Grand Series.

Roles

Synopsis

The opera opens with Whitman volunteering as a nurse at a Union hospital. John Wormley, a wounded soldier, appears at the hospital claiming to be a Union soldier and Whitman tends to his wounds. In the midst of Whitman's ministrations, the two become sexually intimate, and Whitman composes a letter on behalf of Wormley. Unbeknownst to Whitman, Wormley is in fact a Confederate soldier, and the letter will alert the Confederacy to the hospital's location so that they can destroy it. Wormley subsequently confronts Whitman, accusing him of perversion and questioning his motives. A messenger arrives to announce the war's end, and the shell-shocked soldiers react with muted enthusiasm.

Reception

Anthony Tommasini of the New York Times called the work "taut" and "inspired", praising the performers, direction and score. Tommasini reserved particular praise for Aucoin's vocal writing and orchestration. Mark Swed of the Los Angeles Times termed the work "troublingly perceptive", while calling it "a young man’s work in both its impressive over-insistence and just plain over-insistence". Vulture's Justin Davidson called the work "dramatically static" and criticized its pacing. WBUR's Llyod Schwartz criticized the work as "high-minded" and "inflated", though he praised the orchestration as "dazzling".

Several critics noted the influence of other composers on the score, including Benjamin Britten, John Adams, Philip Glass and Thomas Adès.

References

External links
 Work details, commentary, videos, matthewaucoin.com
 , Harvard University, 2015

Operas by Matthew Aucoin
2015 operas
English-language operas
Operas
Operas set in the United States
Operas based on real people
Operas set in the 19th century
Cultural depictions of nurses
Cultural depictions of poets
Cultural depictions of American men
Musical compositions about the American Civil War
LGBT-related operas
Musical settings of poems by Walt Whitman